Candlenut Kitchen, often known simply as Candlenut, is a Singaporean restaurant serving the local Peranakan cuisine. Located at the Tanglin district, the restaurant is owned by Malcolm Lee, who also serves as its executive chef.

Overview
The restaurant has been featured in various local and overseas publications such as diningcity, United Kingdom's Financial Times and Singapore's 8 Days magazine. Popular dishes include the Buah keluak ice-cream that was named one of SG Magazine's "50 things to eat before you die" in 2013.

Awards 
The restaurant received one star in the Michelin Guide's inaugural 2016 Singapore edition, the first ever Michelin star awarded for Peranakan cuisine.

In popular media
The restaurant was featured and visited by South Korean band Twice for their TWICE TV series (TWICE TV6) when they were in Singapore.

See also 
 List of Michelin starred restaurants in Singapore
 List of restaurants in Singapore

References 

Restaurants in Singapore
Michelin Guide starred restaurants in Singapore